Beardbrand is an American men's grooming company based in Austin, Texas. It sells products for grooming, styling, and maintaining of beards, hair, skin, and mustaches. In 2014, Beardbrand founder and CEO Eric Bandholz appeared on an episode of the reality television series Shark Tank.

Company history
 
Prior to founding Beardbrand, Eric Bandholz worked as a financial advisor at Merrill Lynch in Spokane, Washington. Bandholz has stated his disapproval of the company's "no facial hair" policy, and left in favor of starting a beard grooming company. 
 
In 2011, he attended a Startup Weekend event in Spokane where he met Lindsey Reinders and Jeremy McGee. The three would go on to launch Beardbrand in Spokane in early 2012 along with a complementary Tumblr blog, YouTube channel, and an online magazine called Urban Beardsman (a term Bandholz has claimed to have coined).
 
Bandholz, Reinders, and McGee started with an initial financial capital of $8,000. None of them kept any profits from sales in the first 10 months of the company in an effort to keep it afloat. In January 2013, Bandholz was featured as a "beard expert" in an article for The New York Times. After the article was published, Beardbrand began aggressively marketing itself across several platforms like YouTube, Tumblr, and Reddit, and it also launched its online store.
 
The company relocated to Austin, Texas in 2014. On October 31, 2014, Bandholz appeared on an episode of ABC's Shark Tank in an effort to accrue more funding for Beardbrand. Bandholz asked for $400,000 in exchange for 15% of the company. After Bandholz gave his pitch, all five "sharks" (Mark Cuban, Robert Herjavec, Lori Greiner, Kevin O'Leary, and Daymond John) declined to accept his deal.

Since their beginning in 2012, Beardbrand's YouTube channel has been an important part of the marketing of their company. As of March 1, 2019, the company has more than 1,000,000 subscribers on their YouTube channel. Their channel includes videos that provide information about beards, offer grooming tips, show barbershops and provide other content related to maintaining a beard. A lot of Beardbrand's publicity has come from their YouTube channel, and the channel has introduced many that have become familiar faces related to the company, including: Eric Bandholz, Carlos Costa, Greg Berzinsky, Jeff Buoncristiano and Jack Milocco.

References

External links

www.youtube.com/user/TheBeardbrand
https://www.failory.com/interview/beardbrand

American companies established in 2012
Companies based in Austin, Texas